Dzmitry Dudar (born 8 November 1991) is a Belarusian professional footballer who plays for Torpedo-BelAZ Zhodino.

References

External links 
 
 
 Profile at Dinamo Brest website 

1991 births
Living people
Belarusian footballers
Association football goalkeepers
FC Belcard Grodno players
FC Khimik Svetlogorsk players
FC Dynamo Brest players
FC Granit Mikashevichi players
FC Slutsk players
FC Gomel players
FC Neman Grodno players
FC Torpedo-BelAZ Zhodino players